Richard Harper may refer to:
 Richard Harper (politician), English local politician
 Richard H. R. Harper, British computer scientist and author